Pedro Landeta Azcueta also known as Aureliano of the Blessed Sacrament was a Professed Priest of the Discalced Carmelites.

Early life 
Azcueta was born on 27 June 1887 in Artunduaga de Basauri, Spain.

Priesthood 
He joined the novitiate of the Teresian Carmel of Larrea on 21 April 1900 and took the name Aureliano on 5 August 1903. He was ordained a priest on 10 December 1910 in the cathedral of Pamplona  and sent to India as a missionary in 1913. On 5 October 1912, he along with two more companions landed in Bombay. He reached Ernákulam on 9 October 1912 in a motorboat. He worked in Malabar, India.

Mission in India 
In India, Azcueta directed and encouraged the young seminarians for many years. He was national director of the Eucharistic League from 1928 to 1945. He organized National Eucharistic Congresses in India in 1931 and 1937, and helped foster daily and noctural eucharistic adoration in India, Burma and Ceylon. In 1933 he published a schedule of 868 churches in which adoration continued 24 hours a day.

Death & Veneration 
He died in Ernakulam, India on 16 November 1963.

Pedro was Venerated on 26 March 1999 by Pope John Paul II.

Works 

 The mirror of priests : or a series of questions for the examination of conscience on ascetic life and pastoral duties to which is added A little treasury of selected prayers
Cursus asceticus
Manuale cursus vitae spiritualis
The Holy Eucharist : sermons reprinted from "The Eucharist and Priest"
Manuale Cursus Ascetici : Complectans Tres Vias Vitae Spiritualis Purgativam, Illuminativam et Unitivam
The Divine Consoler

See also 
List of saints of India

References 

Spanish Roman Catholic missionaries
1963 deaths
Discalced Carmelites
19th-century Spanish Roman Catholic priests
1887 births
Venerated Catholics by Pope John Paul II
Roman Catholic missionaries in India
Catholic saints